Normand Lockwood (March 19, 1906 – March 9, 2002) was an American composer born in New York, New York. He studied composition at the University of Michigan from 1921–1924, and then traveled to Rome and studied composition under Ottorino Respighi from 1925 to 1926, and during this time he also had composition lessons with Nadia Boulanger in Paris.  He won a Prix de Rome in 1929 that allowed him to continue his work in Rome.  He was a National Patron of Delta Omicron, an international professional music fraternity.

Professorships
Lockwood returned to America in 1932, becoming an associate professor of composition and theory at Oberlin Conservatory, and won Guggenheim Fellowships in both 1943 and 1944. He taught at Columbia University and the Sacred School of Music from 1945–1953, Trinity University (Texas) from 1953–1955, University of Wyoming from 1955–57, University of Oregon from 1957–1959, and University of Hawaii from 1960–1961. He was Composer-in-Residence at the University of Denver, Colorado from 1961 until becoming Professor Emeritus in 1974.  He died in Denver, Colorado on March 9, 2002, ten days short of his 96th birthday.

Important works
Lockwood composed works in many forms, but he was most well known for his choral works, which were mostly based on religious texts. He also composed operas, orchestral symphonies and suites, and instrumental and vocal chamber music.

Choral
The Birth of Moses, 1947
The Closing Doxology, 1952
Prairie (setting of Carl Sandburg writings), 1953

Opera
The Scarecrow (1945)
Early Dawn (1961)
Wizards of Balizar, 1962
The Hanging Judge, 1964
Requiem for a Rich Young Man, 1964

Orchestral
Symphony (1941)
Concerto for organ, trumpets (2), trombones (2) (1951)

Chamber
Trio (flute, viola and harp). 1939
String Quartet No.3 (published 1948)
To Margarita Debayle (voice and piano), 1977
Trio (violin, cello, and piano),  1984
Psalms 17 & 114 (mezzo-soprano and organ), 1985

The Normand Lockwood Collection
The Normand Lockwood Collection is located in the American Music Research Center archives of the University of Colorado at Boulder and contains materials dated from 1921–1996. The collection size is 112 linear feet, and it contains many of his original scores, personal records, correspondence, student compositions, and audio recordings.

Notes

External links
Interview with Normand Lockwood, February 12, 1986
American Composers Alliance page

American male classical composers
American classical composers
20th-century classical composers
1906 births
2002 deaths
University of Oregon faculty
University of Michigan School of Music, Theatre & Dance alumni
20th-century American composers
20th-century American male musicians